Marc Anthony Boutte (born July 25, 1969) is a former American football defensive tackle in the National Football League (NFL) for the Washington Redskins and the Los Angeles Rams. He played high school football at Lake Charles- Boston in Lake Charles. He played college football at Louisiana State University and was drafted in the third round of the 1992 NFL draft. He has one daughter, Madison Victoria Boutte.

References

1969 births
Living people
American football defensive tackles
Washington Redskins players
Los Angeles Rams players
LSU Tigers football players